This list of the tallest chimneys in the world ranks chimneys by height.

Use
This is to increase the stack effect and disperse pollutants. Only a few smelters, steel mills, chemical factories and oil refineries use such tall chimneys.

Timeline of world's tallest chimney
Since the beginning of the industrial revolution, tall chimneys were built, at the beginning with bricks, and later also of concrete or steel. Although chimneys never held the absolute height record, they are among the tallest free-standing architectural structures and often hold national records (as tallest free-standing or as overall tallest structures of a country).

Hamon Custodis claims to have built a  stack in 1953, but there are no references to the location or client of this/these stack(s). No other references or information can be found to corroborate this claim.

Current
 Indicates a structure that is no longer standing.

Japanese Steel Smokestacks
This is a list of Japanese smokestacks built from large sections of steel pipe. The majority of tall steel chimneys in the world are located in Japan. Unlike other modern developed countries which use reinforced concrete to build tall chimneys, Japan has historically used steel until recently in smokestack construction.

See also
 List of tallest freestanding structures
 List of tallest towers
 Solar power tower
 List of elevator test towers
 List of tallest cooling towers
 List of tallest oil platforms
 List of tallest industrial buildings

References

Lists of construction records
Chinmey